= Malabar Hill Club =

Malabar Hill Club (formerly WIAA Club) is a sports club based in Mumbai, India. Membership at the club is limited and is difficult to procure.
